The Durham Plant-Name Glossary (MS Durham, Cathedral Library, Hunter 100) is a glossary translating Latin and Greek plant-names into Old English/Middle English. It was copied in Durham in the early twelfth century. Its principal sources were Greek-Latin-Old English plant-name glossary whose lemmata come from Dioscorides’s De materia medica, which also contributed lemmata and glosses to the Épinal-Erfurt glossaries, and those entries in the Old English Herbarium which translate Latin plant-names with vernacular plant-names. A text very like the Durham Plant-Name Glossary was one major source of the more extensive Laud Herbal Glossary.

References

Old English literature
Glossaries
12th-century books
Botany books